Rustu Cumhur Oranci (born October 28, 1960 in Istanbul) is a Turkish writer and literary translator. He left Turkey before the coup d'état of 12 September 1980 and spent some time in Europe working as journalist. He became a radio operator on merchant vessels. He wrote a magical realist account of his life on the high seas in his first novel Butterfly’in İntihar Seferi (The Suicide Voyage of the Butterfly), published by Telos, Istanbul in 1991.

He currently lives in Istanbul and works as a full-time writer.

External links
 Cumhur Oranci's official site

Turkish writers
Turkish translators
1960 births
Living people
Translators from English
Translators to Turkish